Antonella Ruggiero (born 15 November 1952) is an Italian singer.

Biography
Antonella Ruggiero was born in Genoa, Liguria and made her first recording, Io Matia ("I Matia" in English), in 1974. Matia is the stage name under which Antonella Ruggiero officially began her solo career with the first and rare 45 rpm vinyl record (Matia in Genoa's language means "crazyness" or "crazy woman"), however she had already collaborated (unofficially) with the Jet in their LP vinyl record Faith, Hope and Charity lending her leading voice in the choruses. It was from the union of some members of both the Jet and Matia that in 1975 the band Matia Bazar was created.

Ruggiero is classified as a light soprano and has an extraordinary voice that far exceeds 4 octaves thanks to the use of the whistle register.

In 1975 with Piero Cassano (voice and keyboards), Aldo Stellita (bass), Giancarlo Golzi (drums), and Carlo Marrale (voice and guitars) she established the historical group Matia Bazar.  Pop hits from the band included: “Ma perché”, “Solo tu”, “Per un’ora d’amore”, “Stasera che sera”, “Cavallo bianco”, “Il video sono io”, “Mister Mandarino”, "Souvenir", “Ti Sento” and “Vacanze romane”.

Ti Sento was their major hit. It was number one in Belgium and Italy.

Her partnership with the group lasted until 1989. Seven years after, in 1996, she made her solo debut with the album Libera, the result of a cathartic journey carried out in new cultural and musical atmospheres.

In the 1998 edition of the Sanremo Festival Ruggiero placed second with “Amore lontanissimo”, which also earned the critics' award for best arrangement. In 1999 she performed at the Ariston Theater stage with “Non ti dimentico (Se non ci fossero le nuvole)” written together with her husband Roberto Colombo, and was classified in second place again. This song was dedicated to Aldo Stellita, former stage companion (he was founder member/author/bass player of Matia Bazar) and for many years her friend, who died prematurely in 1998. Immediately after the festival, Ruggiero released her third CD as soloist, Sospesa. This album included the participations of Ennio Morricone, who companied "And Will You Love Me", and Giovanni Lindo Ferretti, who co-wrote "Di perle e inverni" with Ruggiero and Roberto Colombo.

In 2003 she was back in the Sanremo contest with “Di un amore” (where she finished in ninth place).

On 4 June 2004 she performed a concert in the Brooklyn Museum of New York as a worldwide preview of her CD/DVD entitled Sacrarmonia Live (Il viaggio) with sacred songs of Christian inspiration from several parts of the world. On 25 November 2004 she performed at The Sugar Club in Dublin, accompanied by Mark Harris (piano), Carlo Cantini (strings) and Ivan Ciccarelli (percussions).

In 2005 she re-entered the Sanremo contest with “Echi d’infinito”, where she was awarded first prize in the “Women” category, and third in overall classification.
In 2005, together with both the Chorus Sant'Ilario di Rovereto  and the Chorus of Valle Dei Laghi di Padergnone  she became the character of the “Echi d’infinito” project, a recovery of Alpine pop songs and also of her own songs accompanied only by human voice.
 
She frequently has toured with different kinds of concerts: "Sacrarmonia", a concert dedicated to sacred music of the world; "Tribute to Amalia Rodrigues", a concert committed to the Portuguese fado and its more famous performer; "Four steps for Broadway", a recital devoted to the most popular Broadway musicals (“Tonight”, “Over The Rainbow”, “Summertime”); and the Stralunato Recital Concert where she performs her most meaningful and famous songs.

In 2007 she participated once again in the Sanremo with the song "Canzone fra le guerre" (written in collaboration with Cristian Carrara), which was ranked in tenth place in the end. During Sanremo's third evening (dedicated to hosts), she performed unaccompanied singing in contest with both the Chorus of Valle Dei Laghi and the Chorus of S. Ilario.

While maintaining the pop music that made her famous, even abroad, Antonella Ruggiero also lends her voice to music of different origins and cultures. She has performed many times in English-language countries, including a version of “Ti sento” known in the United Kingdom as “I Feel You”.

In October 2009, the German dance act Scooter released a cover version of "Ti Sento" featuring the vocals of Ruggiero. She also appeared in the accompanying music video, playing an opera singer. The single peaked at number ten on the German Singles Chart in October 2009, becoming Ruggiero's first German top ten hit in her career. The Matia Bazar original version peaked at number eleven in August 1986.

In 2010 she made two new album: "Contemporanea tango" (live CD), which is a "trip" through the history of Tango, and "I regali di natale" (double CD) which is an album dedicated to Christmas music from the Middle Ages to the 1940s. The disc contains musical atmospheres from classic music to jazz music, with slight hints of pop and electronic music.

In 2014 she participated once again in the Sanremo with two songs "Da lontano" and "Quando balliamo", during the first evening of the Festival. The audience chose to send ahead in the competition the song "Da lontano", which was ranked in twelfth place in the end.

On February 19, 2014, the album "L'impossibile è certo", collecting  unpublished songs from 1989 debuted, ranking 18th on the FIMI chart.

On June 18, 2015, a collaboration with ConiglioViola gives life to "Requiem Elettronico", a collection of ten Italian pop songs focused on the theme of death. The album was released alongside a DVD, containing the recording of two live performances and some film clips shot by ConiglioViola.  

On October 31, 2015, Ruggiero sings Domenico Modugno's "In the blue painted blue" accompanied by children's choirs during the closing ceremony of the EXPO world fair in Milan, an outstanding event hosting the President of the Republic Sergio Mattarella and the highest national and international institutional officials.

On November 13, 2015, the album "Cattedrali" was released debuting on position N.69 in the FIMI ranking. It features the organist Fausto Caporali recorded live in the Cathedral of Cremona on October 24, 2014.

On November 25, 2016, the album "La vita imprevedibile delle canzoni", recorded at Fazioli Pianoforti factory in Sacile was released for Sony Classical. On the disc, 15 songs from Antonella Ruggiero's repertoire are given a new sound, played on the classical piano by the master Andrea Bacchetti. The arrangements are curated by Stefano Barzan.  

On November 20, 2018, the album "Quando facevo la cantante" was released, recalling her solo career from 1996 to 2018.

The boxed set contains a total of 115 songs recorded both live and in studio, sorted into 6 CDs: The dialectal song, My songs, The song of the author, Songs from the world, The sacred and the classic, The oddities.

Discography

Album
1996 - Libera
1998 - Registrazioni moderne
1999 - Sospesa
2001 - Luna crescente - Sacrarmonia
2003 - Antonella Ruggiero
2005 - Big Band!
2006 - L'abitudine della luce
2007 - Genova, la Superba
2008 - Pomodoro genetico
2013 - Qualcosa è nell'aria - digital album available to download via Antonella's official website (3 tracks)
2014 - L'impossibile è certo
2015 - Cattedrali
2016 - La vita imprevedibile delle canzoni
2018 - Quando facevo la cantante

Singles 

 1974 - La strada del perdono/Io, Matia (feat. Jet)
 1996 - La filastrocca
 1996 - La danza (radio edit, album version)
 1997 - Per un'ora d'amore (feat. Subsonica)
 1997 - Fantasia (feat. Bluvertigo)
 1997 - Solo tu MIX
 1998 - Amore lontanissimo
 1998 - Donde estas
 1999 - Non ti dimentico
 1999 - Controvento
 1999 - Non dirmi dove, non dirmi quando
 1999 - Il sole al nadir (radio vers., jungle vers.) - soundtrack Harem Suare - Ferzan Özpetek
 2001 - Occhi di bambino / Kyrie / Ave Maria
 2003 - Il bosco dell'acqua (exhibition "abitare il Tempo" - XVIII Edition - Verona)
 2003 - Il bravo giardiniere
 2003 - Di un amore
 2005 - Echi d'infinito
 2019 - Senza
 2020 - Con

Cover Album
2010 - I regali di Natale (Christmas songs)

Compilation
2012 - Il meglio di Antonella Ruggiero (the best of - double CDs)

Live Album
2004 - Sacrarmonia Live
2006 - Stralunato recital live
2007 - Souvenir d'Italie
2009 - Cjanta Vilotis
2010 - Contemporanea Tango (feat. "Hyperion Ensemble" orchestra)
2012 - Buon Natale - Live in concert (feat. "I Virtuosi Italiani" orchestra)
2015 - Requiem Elettronico (feat. ConiglioViola)
2020 - Empatia

External links

Official website

1952 births
Living people
Musicians from Genoa
Italian women singers